Ernests Štālbergs (1883–1958) was a Latvian architect whose works are in the Neoclassical and the functionalistic styles.

Štālbergs trained at the Kazan Art School from 1902 through 1904.  His notable works include the auditorium at the University of Latvia (1929–36) and the ensemble of the Freedom Monument in Riga (1930–35; with sculptor Kārlis Zāle).

References
Ernests Štālbergs 100 Latvians.
 Васильев Ю., Э. Шталберг (1883—1958), в сборнике: Из истории техники Латвийской ССР, в. 5, Рига, 1964.
 Большая Советская энциклопедия: В 30 т. - 3-е изд. - М., 1969–1978. Том: 29, Стр.: 486, Э. Е. Шталберг.
 Энциклопедия «Рига», —Рига: Главная редакция энциклопедий, —1989, Шталберг Эрнест Екабович, —стр. 784,.
 Архитектура Советской Латвии, И. Страутманис, О. Бука, Я. Крастиньш, Г. Асарис, —Москва, —«Стройиздат», —1987, —320с.
 Rīgas arhitektūras astoņi gadsimti pasaules kultūras spogulī, Ojārs Spārītis, Jānis Krastiņš, —Rīga, —«SIA Nacionālais apgāds», —2005. .

Architects from Riga
Academicians of the Latvian SSR Academy of Sciences
1883 births
1958 deaths
People from Liepāja
Academic staff of the University of Latvia
Soviet architects